The 1972–73 NBA season was the Detroit Pistons' 25th season in the NBA and 16th season in the city of Detroit.   The team played at Cobo Arena in downtown Detroit.

The Pistons finished with a 40-42 (.488) record, 3rd place in the Midwest Division.  The team was led guard Dave Bing (22.4 ppg, 7.8 apg, NBA All-Star), center Bob Lanier (23.8 ppg, 14.9 rpg, NBA All-Star) and forward Curtis Rowe (16.1 ppg).  Coach Earl Lloyd was fired after 7 games, replaced by former Pistons player Ray Scott, who led the team to a 38–37 record under his direction.  Lanier credited Scott with an improved culture, stating, “He took over and we started playing collectively as a unit.  We had a good feeling, and we related well with one another.”

Draft picks

Roster

Regular season

Season standings

z, y – division champions
x – clinched playoff spot

Record vs. opponents

Game log

References

Detroit
Detroit Pistons seasons
Detroit Pistons
Detroit Pistons